The 2013 Porsche Carrera Cup Germany season was the 28th German Porsche Carrera Cup season. It began on 4 May at Hockenheim and finished on 4 October at the same circuit, after seventeen races, with two races at each event bar Round 3. It ran as a support championship for the 2013 DTM season. Frenchman Kévin Estre won the championship for Hermes ATTEMPTO Racing. British Tolimit Motorsport driver Sean Edwards was killed on 15 October 2013 at Queensland Raceway in Willowbank, Australia, while instructing a member of the public at a private test session.

Teams and drivers

Race calendar and results

1# – Race staged on the Sunday due to a pileup in the first start on the Saturday.

Championship standings

A-class

† — Drivers did not finish the race, but were classified as they completed over 90% of the race distance.

B-class

External links
 
 Porsche Carrera Cup Germany Online Magazine

Porsche Carrera Cup Germany seasons
Porsche Carrera Cup Germany